Viktor Chaika; real name Viktor Grigorievich Sigal; (born December 11, 1958, Odessa, USSR) is a  Soviet and Russian pop composer, songwriter, singer and musician. Known for dozens of songs for Aleksey Glyzin  (Winter Garden, You're Not an Angel), Tatyana Ovsiyenko (Captain, Beautiful Girl), Irina Allegrova (Transit Passenger, Drafts,  Imagined) and many other pop stars. Some time singing solo (Mona Lisa,  Where Are You Going Anywhere). He worked as a music producer on the show Boris Moiseev, and the manager of tours of foreign performers. Pesnya Goda Multiple nominee and winner of the festival. He wrote the music for several films.

References

External links
 Blatata.com
 Виктор Чайка в программе «Званый ужин» 6.07.2010

1958 births
Living people
Musicians from Odesa
Soviet male composers
Russian male composers
American male composers
Soviet male singers
Russian record producers
Soviet male poets
20th-century Russian male writers
Russian male poets
20th-century Russian male singers
20th-century Russian singers
Easy listening musicians
Russian Jews